Sevenoaks District Council is the local authority for the Sevenoaks District in Kent, England. The council is elected every four years.

Political control
The first election to the council was held in 1973, initially operating as a shadow authority before coming into its powers on 1 April 1974. Political control of the council since 1973 has been held by the following parties:

Leadership
The leaders of the council since 1999 have been:

Council elections
1973 Sevenoaks District Council election
1976 Sevenoaks District Council election
1979 Sevenoaks District Council election (New ward boundaries)
1983 Sevenoaks District Council election
1987 Sevenoaks District Council election (Some new ward boundaries & district boundary changes also took place)
1991 Sevenoaks District Council election

District result maps

By-election results

2003-2007

2007-2011

2011-2015

2015-2019

2019-2023

References

External links

 
Council elections in Kent
District council elections in England